Cardigan Lifeboat Station, at Poppit Sands, North Pembrokeshire, near Cardigan, Ceredigion, Wales, is a Royal National Lifeboat Institution (RNLI) lifeboat station opened in 1849. The station closed in 1932 but reopened in 1971 as an inshore lifeboat station.

The present station operates both a D-class lifeboat and a B-class Atlantic 75 lifeboat.

History 
The original Cardigan lifeboat station was built in 1849 (on the south side of the River Teifi estuary below Penrhyn Castle) after the loss of the crew from the brig Agnes Lee. This station was taken over by the RNLI the following year. In 1876 a replacement boathouse with slipway was built, the remains of which can be seen down the estuary at Black Rocks. In 1880, a small breakwater was built to protect the boathouse and launching site. The boathouse was abandoned in 1932, and the all-weather lifeboat was withdrawn, leaving the nearest stations at Fishguard and New Quay. 
The subsequent popularity of this area, with increased leisure incidents and accidents, led to the decision to construct a new station on the present site; this opened in 1971.

In 1987 a new boathouse, built for the new C-class lifeboat, was officially opened.  Then in 1998 a new double boathouse was completed for a B-class and D-class lifeboats, for the Talus MB-4H launching vehicle, and it also provided improved crew facilities. Consequently, the station today houses two inshore lifeboats, which operate from the beach.

The lifeboat crew have training sessions twice a week – on Sunday mornings and Wednesday evenings; visitors to the station are welcomed at these times. The station also houses an RNLI shop, open throughout the year, volunteers permitting.

Associated with the lifeboat station is a coastguard lookout post, part of the Maritime and Coastguard Agency Emergency Response, located on the other side of the estuary, on the cliff top at Gwbert.

In December 2011 a crew at the station – comprising Gemma Griffiths, Sarah Griffiths and Louise Francis - made history by being the first all-female volunteer lifeboat crew to respond to a callout in Wales.

Fleet

All-weather lifeboats (1849–1932)

Inshore lifeboats (1971–present)

C- & D-class

B-class

Awards

Five RNLI medals, three silver and two bronze, are among the various awards presented for service at Cardigan Lifeboat Station. These include:
 In 1873 Coastguard Richard Jinks received a Silver Medal for saving two crew members from the Ocean, a boat which had run aground on Cardigan Bar.
 In 1888 Coxswain William Niles received a long service Silver Medal. 
 In 1901 Coxswain David Rees received a Silver Medal on his retirement.
 In 1919 A Bronze Medal was awarded to Coxswain Thomas Bowen for his part in the rescue of 10 seamen from the steam yacht Conservator
 In 1972 V Evans and R Evans received Letters of Thanks following the rescue of four people after their boat capsized on Cardigan Bar.
 In 1979 Helmsman Vernon Evans was awarded the Thanks of the Institution for saving four crew members from the yacht Snow Rych in Cardigan Bay.
 In 1980, following the saving of four people and a dog from a motor cruiser in 5m seas, Helmsman Robert Reynolds received a Bronze Medal, and Vernon Evans and Charles Sharp were awarded the Thanks of the Institution.
 In 1997 Crew Members Jeremy Thomas and Leonard Walters received the Thanks of the Institution following the rescue of three people from near Penbryn Beach, who had been cut off by the tide.
 In 2005, after saving three men cut off by the tide at Fathganeg Rock, and in very dangerous conditions, helmsman Dyfrig Brown received the Thanks of the Institution.
 In 2013 Walter and Elizabeth Groombridge Award.
 In 2013 the St David Bravery Award was given to Derek Pusey, Leonard Walters and Clive Williams for the night rescue of walkers cut off by the tide. 
 In 2014 The Lady Swaythling Trophy was awarded to Helmsman Derek Pusey from the Shipwrecked Mariners' Society.
 In 2014 Crewman Clive Williams received a Commendation for bravery from the Shipwrecked Mariners' Society.
 In 2014 Helmsman Leonard Walters received a Framed letter of thanks of the Institution.
Note: The three 2014 awards were made for the same rescue

See also
 Royal National Lifeboat Institution

References

External links
 Cardigan Lifeboat station on the RNLI website
 Cardigan Lifeboat Station - official website
 "Site about Cardigan & District Shipwrecks and Lifeboat Service"

1822 establishments in Wales
lifeboat station
Lifeboat stations in Wales
Transport infrastructure completed in 1822